Sergey Ilich Kuznetsov (2 June 1918 – 2010) was a Russian athlete. He competed in the men's decathlon at the 1952 Summer Olympics, representing the Soviet Union.

References

External links
 

1918 births
2010 deaths
Athletes (track and field) at the 1952 Summer Olympics
Russian decathletes
Olympic athletes of the Soviet Union
Sportspeople from Kemerovo
Date of death missing
Place of death missing
Soviet decathletes